The Canadian Review of American Studies is a triannual peer-reviewed academic journal concerning American Studies journal outside the United States. It is the only journal in Canada that deals with cross-border themes and their implications for multicultural societies. It is published by the on behalf of the Canadian Association for American Studies with the support of Carleton University.

Abstracting and indexing
The journal is abstracted and indexed in:
 Academic Search Alumni Edition
 Academic Search Complete
 Academic Search Elite
 Academic Search Premier
 Academic Search Ultimate
 Advanced Placement Source
 America: History and Life
 America: History and Life with Full Text
 Arts and Humanities Citation Index
 Canadian Almanac & Directory
 Canadian Reference Centre
 China Education Publications Import & Export Corporation (CEPIEC)
 Corporate ResourceNet
 CrossRef
 Current Contents
 Current Contents—Arts and Humanities
 EJS EBSCO Electronic Journals Service
 Google Scholar
 History Reference Center
 Humanities International Complete
 Humanities International Index
 Humanities Source
 Humanities Source Ultimate
 International Bibliography of Book Reviews of Scholarly Literature on the Humanities and Social Sciences (IBR)
 International Bibliography of Periodical Literature on the Humanities and Social Sciences (IBZ) 
 International Bibliography of the Social Sciences (IBSS)
 MasterFILE Complete
 MasterFILE Elite
 MasterFILE Premier
 Microsoft Academic Search
 MLA International Bibliography
 Project MUSE
 Scopus
 TOPICsearch
 Ulrich's Periodicals Directory

References

External links
 

University of Toronto Press academic journals
Quarterly journals
Publications established in 1970
English-language journals
1970 establishments in Canada